Bonnabeau Dome is a prominent ice-covered dome mountain rising on the west side of Gopher Glacier,  west of the similar-appearing Anderson Dome, in the Jones Mountains. It was mapped by the University of Minnesota Jones Mountains Party, 1960–61, and named by them for Dr. Raymond C. Bonnabeau, Jr., medical doctor with the party.

References 

Ice caps of Antarctica
Bodies of ice of Ellsworth Land